Marcos David Miers (born 24 March 1990) is a Paraguayan footballer who plays as a centre-back for Paraguayan club Sol de América.

Honours
Nacional
Paraguayan Primera División: 2009 Clausura, 2011 Apertura, 2013 Apertura

External links

1990 births
Living people
Association football defenders
Paraguayan footballers
Paraguayan expatriate footballers
Expatriate footballers in Peru
Paraguayan expatriate sportspeople in Peru
Expatriate footballers in Bolivia
Paraguayan expatriate sportspeople in Bolivia
Expatriate footballers in Ecuador
Paraguayan expatriate sportspeople in Ecuador
Expatriate footballers in Venezuela
Paraguayan expatriate sportspeople in Venezuela
Expatriate footballers in Argentina
Paraguayan expatriate sportspeople in Argentina
Paraguayan Primera División players
Club Nacional footballers
Independiente F.B.C. footballers
Sportivo Luqueño players
Peruvian Primera División players
Club Alianza Lima footballers
Bolivian Primera División players
Sport Boys footballers
Club Sol de América footballers
Ecuadorian Serie A players
C.S.D. Macará footballers
Venezuelan Primera División players
Asociación Civil Deportivo Lara players
Argentine Primera División players
Aldosivi footballers